John III the Terrible, also John III the Brave (1521 – June 14, 1574) was Voivode of Moldavia between February 1572 and June 1574.

He was the grandson of Bogdan III and the son of Stephen IV and his Armenian mistress Serpega. It is said he spent part of his life being a merchant in Constantinople, where he had closely studied the Ottomans and their weaknesses.

Ioan was one of the last medieval Romanian rulers to battle the Ottoman Turks. His nickname "the Terrible" was a result of his harsh treatment of the Boyars, the Moldavian nobility, which at that time were very influential in deciding the rulers of the small principality. Attempting to strengthen his rule and make an example out of disloyal nobles, Ioan III carried out several Boyar executions, thus earning his alias "the Terrible". The common people appreciated his courageous stand against the nobility's corruption and the harsh Turkish domination. He refused to double the amount of tribute paid to the Ottomans but the Moldovan army was defeated in the Battle of Cahul Lake, he was captured and executed.

His short reign was marked by fierce combat against the Ottoman Empire and their Crimean Tatar allies. In order to counter the power of the Ottomans, he allied himself with the Ukrainian Cossacks. He was victorious at the battles of Jiliște, the Siege of Brăila, Tighina and Cetatea Albă. When an army of 150,000 Turks was sent against him, he personally surrendered, being promised that his Moldavian soldiers and Cossack allies would be spared in exchange for his capture. He was killed by the Ottomans by tying his body to four camels, which were driven in different directions. His soldiers were nonetheless slaughtered mercilessly.

See also

References

1521 births
1574 deaths
Rulers of Moldavia
Romanian people executed abroad
Romanian people of Armenian descent
Moldovan people of Armenian descent
16th-century executions by the Ottoman Empire
People executed by dismemberment